Gliese 832 b (Gl 832 b or GJ 832 b) is an extrasolar planet located approximately 16 light-years from the Sun in the constellation of Grus, orbiting the red dwarf star Gliese 832.

Orbit

The planet takes 3416 days to revolve at an orbital distance of 3.4 AU; this is the longest-period Jupiter-like planet orbiting a red dwarf. The brightness of the faint parent star at that distance corresponds to the brightness of the Sun from 80 AU (or a 100 times brighter than a full Moon as seen from Earth).

Discovery

The planet was discovered in the Anglo-Australian Observatory on September 1, 2008.

References

External links
 

Exoplanets discovered in 2008
Grus (constellation)
Giant planets
Exoplanets detected by radial velocity
Gliese 832